Dunderrow is a small village in County Cork, Ireland located on the R605 road between Innishannon and Kinsale. Dún Darú, anglicised as Dunderrow, means the fort of the oak-plain, with the site of the fort (dún) for which it is named located to the south of the village.

Dunderrow National School, in the centre of the village, was built in 2000 to replace an earlier 19th century building. To the east of the village is Dunderrow cemetery, formerly the site of a 19th-century Church of Ireland church (no longer standing).

An Eli Lilly facility is situated near Dunderrow on 112 acres of land. It commenced operations in 1981.

See also
 List of towns and villages in Ireland

References

External links
 Dunderrow National School website

Towns and villages in County Cork